OJ may refer to:

 Orange juice

People

In American football 

 O. J. Simpson (born 1947), American football player, broadcaster, actor, and convicted felon
 Ottis Jerome "O.J." Anderson (born 1957), American football player
 O. J. Childress (born 1976), American football player
 O. J. Howard (born 1994), American football player
 O. J. McDuffie (born 1969), American football player

In other sports 

 O. J. Mayo (born 1987), American professional basketball player
 Olivier Jacque (born 1973), French motorcycle road racer
 Olli Jokinen (born 1978), Finnish ice hockey player
 Orlando Jordan (born 1974), American professional wrestler
 Omar 'OJ' Koroma (born 1989), Gambian footballer
 OJ Porteria (born 1994), Filipino footballer

In music 

 OJ da Juiceman (born 1981), American rapper
 Oran "Juice" Jones (born 1959), American soul and R&B singer and actor
 Orlando Julius (born 1943), Nigerian musician sometimes referred to as OJ

In other fields 
 Dennis Mugo, Kenyan actor known as OJ
 OJ Borg (born 1979), British television and radio presenter
 Olivia Jade (born 1999), social media influencer and USC student
 Lindsay Owen-Jones (born 1946), British chairman and CEO of the cosmetics and beauty company L'Oréal

Groups of people 

 Old Johnians:
 :Category:People educated at St John's School, Leatherhead, alumni of St. John's School, Leatherhead, England
 :Category:People educated at Hurstpierpoint College, alumni of Hurstpierpoint College, England
 The O'Jays, a 1970s soul group from Philadelphia, Pennsylvania, United States
 Orange Jackets, a women's service student organization at the University of Texas at Austin
 The Order of Jamaica, the fifth of the six orders in the Jamaican honours system, roughly equivalent to a knighthood in the British honours system, with the post-nominal letters 'OJ' and 'OJ (Hon.)'

Fictional characters 

 O.J. (TUGS), a character from the 1988 children's television series TUGS

Languages 

 Ojibwe language (ISO 639-2 code: oj)
 Old Japanese

Travel 

 Overland Airways (IATA airline designator: OJ)
 Open-jaw ticket, a type of airline ticket

Other uses 
 OJ (programming tool), a programming tool that analyzes Java code
 Official Journal of the European Union
 CJOJ-FM, a Canadian radio station formerly called OJ 95.5
 Orange Julius, a chain of fruit drink beverage stores, or the fruit drink itself
 Japanese model railway gauge for cape gauge in 0 scale

See also

Juice (disambiguation)